Grandview is an unincorporated area and census-designated place (CDP) in Cherokee County, Oklahoma, United States. The population was 394 at the 2010 census.

Geography
Grandview is located near the center of Cherokee County, on the northwest border of Tahlequah, the Cherokee County seat. Oklahoma State Highway 51 Spur, a western bypass of Tahlequah, runs just southeast of the border of Grandview.

Demographics

References

Census-designated places in Cherokee County, Oklahoma
Census-designated places in Oklahoma